The 2019–20 Copa Catalunya was the 31st staging of the Copa Catalunya. The competition began on 4 August 2019 and was played by teams in Segunda División, Segunda División B, Tercera División and the top teams of Primera Catalana.

Qualified teams
The following teams competed in the 2019–20 Copa Catalunya.

1 team of 2018–19 Segunda División

Gimnàstic

8 teams of 2018–19 Segunda División B

Badalona
Barcelona B
Cornellà
Espanyol B
Lleida Esportiu
Olot
Peralada
Sabadell

19 teams of 2018–19 Tercera División

Ascó
Castelldefels
Cerdanyola
Europa
Figueres
Grama
Granollers
Horta
L'Hospitalet
Llagostera
Martinenc
Prat
San Cristóbal
Sant Andreu
Santboià
Santfeliuenc
Sants
Terrassa
Vilafranca

2 teams of 2018–19 Primera Catalana

Andorra
Vilassar de Mar

Tournament
The draw of three first rounds took place on 2 July 2019 at Catalan Football Federation headquarters, in Barcelona. 29 teams entered the draw (all except Gimnàstic). Prat received a bye for the first round and the winner of Horta-Olot game for the second round.

First round
Games played on 2, 3, 4, 6 and 7 August 2019.

|}

Second round
Games played on 10 and 11 August 2019.

|}

Third round
Games played on 17 and 18 August 2019.

|}

Fourth round
Game played on 30 October 2019. Badalona, Llagostera and L'Hospitalet received a bye. In this round, the Segunda División team Gimnàstic entered the competition.

|}

Semifinals
Games played on 27 November 2019.

|}

Final
Played on 9 October 2020 at Terrassa.

|}

References

External links
Results at FCF 
Results  at FutbolCatalunya 

Cata
Copa Catalunya seasons
Copa